The Palestinian Intifada may refer to:

The First Palestinian Intifada began in 1987. Violence declined in 1991 and came to an end with the signing of the Oslo accords (August 1993) and the creation of the Palestinian National Authority
The Second Palestinian Intifada (also known as the al-Aqsa Intifada) was a violent uprising against the Israeli government that began in September 2000. The uprising ended on 8 February 2005